Morbier is a commune in the Jura department in the Bourgogne-Franche-Comté region in Eastern France. In 2019, it had a population of 2,263. From 1680 to 1920, Morbier was, with Morez, the centre of Comtoise clock production. It gave its name to the Morbier cheese, which is produced in a larger area in the Jura Mountains. It is part of Haut-Jura Regional Natural Park.

Population

See also 
 Communes of the Jura department

References 

Communes of Jura (department)